Ursula Schäfer Lamb (born, Essen  Germany 15  January 1914, died, Tucson, Arizona, 8 August 1996) was a distinguished American historian specializing in Latin American history, who published works on the age of exploration and  the history of science. She was a pioneering woman academic in Latin American history, whose interdisciplinary works on history of science and globalization antedate the boom in such studies.

Life and academic career
Lamb was born just before the outbreak of World War I in Germany and came of age in the interwar years.  She attended the University of Berlin (1933–35), during Hitler's early years in power, studying history of art. While a student there she aided Jewish families to escape from Nazi Germany.  She was openly anti-Nazi, and was arrested protesting a Nazi official's speech. In 1935 she was able to come to the U.S., with aid from Quakers, as an exchange student at Smith College. Lamb entered the graduate program at University of California, Berkeley, studying with Herbert E. Bolton. She earned her M.A. in 1937 and her Ph.D. in 1949. The topic of her master's thesis was "Americanization of the Forty-Eighters, 1848-1860," and her doctoral dissertation topic was "Nicolás de Ovando, comendador mayor of Alcántara and governor of the Indies."

Due to prejudices against women in the era, Lamb was "prevented from pursuing her first choices in an academic career." But her difficulties in the U.S. were compounded by her being designated an "enemy alien." Despite her 1939 marriage to a U.S. citizen, distinguished physicist Willis Lamb, who later won a Nobel prize, she could not live within 50 miles of the coast. She completed her dissertation on Nicolás de Ovando in 1949.

She taught at Barnard College (1943–51), Brasenose College, Oxford University (1959–60),  Yale University (1961–1974), and then University of Arizona (1974–84), where she retired in 1984. It was not until she was at University of Arizona that she held a tenured professorial position.

In 1990, she was recognized by the Conference on Latin American History Distinguished Service Award, its highest honor.  She was the first woman to receive it.  The Hispanic American Historical Review took the unusual action of publishing two obituaries of her in the year following her death, with the editor noting that the journal “is pleased to offer its readers another look into the life of a pioneer among women in the field of Latin American history.”
She died of cancer in 1996, survived by her husband of 57 years. An obituary notes that she did not consider herself a feminist, but “she recognized the need for female scholars to be treated as equals.” In her personal life she made a commitment “as a supportive wife to nurture another’s genius.”

Works
 Frey Nicolás de Ovando, Gobernador de las Indias 1501–1509 (1956)
 Science by Litigation: A Cosmographer's Feud (1969)
 The Quarti Partita en Cosmographia by Alonso de Cháves: An Interpretation (1969)
 Martín Fernández de Navarrete clears the deck: The Spanish Hydrographic Office 1802–24 (1980)
 Cosmographies and Pilots of the Spanish Maritime Empire (1995)
 The Globe Encircled and the World Revealed, editor (1995), which includes contributions by Charles R. Boxer, Charles Gibson, Samuel Eliot Morison, J.H. Parry, J.H. Elliott, Woodrow Borah, Murdo J. MacLeod, A.J.R. Russell-Wood, Wilcomb E. Washburn

Honors
Guggenheim Fellowship 1968–69
National Endowment for the Humanities, Senior Fellowship 1972–73
President, Society for the History of Discoveries 1975–77
Grant, National Science Foundation (1978–79)
Jeannette Black Fellow, John Carter Brown Library 1985
Distinguished Service Award, Conference on Latin American History 1990

Further reading
Andreas Daum, "Refugees from Nazi Germany as Historians: Origins and Migrations, Interests and Identities", in The Second Generation: Émigrés from Nazi Germany as Historians. With a Biobibliographic Guide'', ed. Daum, Hartmut Lehmann, James J. Sheehan. Berghahn Books, New York, pp. 1‒52.

References

1914 births
1996 deaths
20th-century German historians
Emigrants from Nazi Germany to the United States
Historians of Latin America
Latin Americanists
German women historians
University of Arizona faculty
20th-century German women